The 2005 Cape Verdean Football Championship season was the 26th of the competition of the first-tier football in Cape Verde. Its started on 14 May and finished on 16 July, earlier than the last season. The tournament was organized by the Cape Verdean Football Federation. FC Derby won the 3rd title and did not receive entry to the 2006 CAF Champions League. No second place club would also receive entry to the 2006 CAF Confederation Cup

Overview 
Sporting Clube da Praia was the defending team of the title. A total of 12 clubs participated in the competition, one from each island league and one who won the last season's title. The season would be the first to have 12 titles for Sporting Praia.

Also it was the only time that a participant from Boa Vista (Desportivo Estância Baixo) came from the Rabil area and Estância de Baixo and the first time that a participant from the north of Santiago was from the municipality of Calheta de São Miguel and was Flor Jovem.

The season would break national records even in scoring, the annual goal totals was 146, Derby scored a record 10-1 against Académica from Porto Novo, later Sporting Praia first scored 6 against Morabeza two weeks later scored a record 13 against Estância Baixo, they would score 6 again in the semis and removing Sal Rei from the finals. Other high scoring matches were Académica from Fogo scored 6 against Morabeza and Derby scored 7 points against Morabeza. Sporting Praia had a record of 35 goals scored (24 in the regular season) and remains unbeaten as of 2016, while Derby scored a record 32 goals (23 in the regular season) . Also in the competition record was the scorer Zé di Tchétcha of Sporting Praia who scored 14 goals and remains unbeaten as of 2015. The Flor Jovem-Paulense match was cancelled and neither two would advance into the playoffs.

Two clubs from Santo Antão who played in the same group had their first meeting since the break-up into the two zones.

Participating clubs 

 SC Sal Rei, winner of the 2004 Cape Verdean Football Championships
 Desportivo Estância Baixo, runner-up of the Boa Vista Island League
 SC Morabeza, winner of the Brava Island League
 Associação Académica do Fogo, winner of the Fogo Island League
 Onze Unidos, winner of the Maio Island League
 Associação Académica do Sal, winner of the Sal Island League
 Flor Jovem da Calheta, winner of the Santiago Island League (North)
 Sporting Clube da Praia, winner of the Santiago Island League (South)
 Paulense Desportivo Clube, winner of the Santo Antão Island League (North)
 Associação Académica do Porto Novo, winner of the Santo Antão Island League (South)
 Desportivo Ribeira Brava, winner of the São Nicolau Island League
 FC Derby, winner of the São Vicente Island League

Information about the clubs

League standings 
 Group A 

 Group B

Results

Final Stages

Semi-finals

Finals

Statistics 
 Top scorer: Zé di Tchecha (14 goals) (Sporting Praia)
 Biggest win: Sporting Praia 13-0 Estância Baixo (June 11)

Notes

Footnotes

External links 
 Cape Verdean Football Federation's website
 2005 Cape Verdean Football Championships at RSSSF

Cape Verdean Football Championship seasons
1
Cape